NGC 2451 is  an open cluster in the Puppis constellation, probably discovered by Giovanni Battista Hodierna before 1654 and John Herschel in 1835. In 1994, it was postulated that this was actually two open clusters that lie along the same line of sight. This was confirmed in 1996. The respective clusters are labeled NGC 2451 A and NGC 2451 B, and they are located at distances of 600 and 1,200 light-years, respectively.

References

External links
 
 NGC 2451 @ SEDS NGC objects pages
 

2451
Open clusters
Puppis